Peter Hykkelbjerg Hertz (born 18 December 1954) is a Danish former footballer who played as a defender. He made one appearance for the Denmark national team in 1980.

References

External links
 
 

1954 births
Living people
Danish men's footballers
Association football defenders
Denmark international footballers
Denmark youth international footballers
Ballerup-Skovlunde Fodbold players
Boldklubben af 1893 players
Brøndby IF players